Chung Hong (born 16 May 1993) is a South Korean tennis player.

On the junior tour, Chung has a career high ITF junior ranking of 64 achieved in January 2011.

Chung has a career high ATP singles ranking of 632 achieved on 2 January 2017. He also has a career high ATP doubles ranking of 624 achieved on 9 June 2014. Chung has won one ITF Futures singles title and two ITF Futures doubles titles.

Playing for South Korea in Davis Cup, Chung has a win–loss record of 0–1.

Chung is the older brother of Chung Hyeon, who is also a professional tennis player.

References

External links
 
 
 

1993 births
Living people
South Korean male tennis players
People from Suwon
Universiade medalists in tennis
Universiade gold medalists for South Korea
Medalists at the 2015 Summer Universiade
Sportspeople from Gyeonggi Province
21st-century South Korean people